Jennifer Bassey (born July 22, 1942) is an American actress who has worked on both stage and screen. She is perhaps best known for her role as Marian Colby in the ABC soap opera All My Children which she played on and off from 1983 until the show's cancellation in 2011.

Life and career
Bassey was born in Chicago, Illinois. After graduating from Royal Academy of Dramatic Art in London, Bassey moved back to the United States and took roles in several Off-Broadway plays. This led to further work in daytime soap operas.

After appearing in Love of Life, The Edge of Night, and Somerset, Bassey changed her professional name from "Joan Bassie" to "Jennifer Bassey." She chose the name Jennifer from Dr. Jennifer Stark, the role she had played on Love of Life. In the early 1990s, Bassey was one of several actresses brought in briefly to replace Eileen Fulton as Lisa on As the World Turns while Fulton was ill.

She began playing Marian Colby on ABC's soap opera All My Children (1983-1987, 1989, 1995-2009, 2011). She has appeared on All My Children for over 20 years and was a favorite among fans. 

A libidinous wealthy widow with a penchant for forbidden romantic trysts, Marian was featured in a variety of storylines, allowing Bassey to showcase a variety of talents in both comedy and drama. In 1998, Bassey won the Soap Opera Digest Award for "Favorite Scene Stealer," and in 1999, alongside co-star David Canary, won the same award for "Favorite Couple". Also, in 1999, Bassey received her first Daytime Emmy nomination in the "Outstanding Supporting Actress" category. Bassey appeared on All My Children in both contract and recurring capacities until the show's 2011 network cancellation, but did not appear on the show's short-lived online incarnation.

Bassey did not participate in the February 2, 2017 All My Children reunion on the Hallmark Channel's Home & Family show. However, Home & Family did utilize footage of Bassey with actor Michael E. Knight from an infamous All My Children storyline wherein Knight's youthful Tad Martin had affairs with both Marian Colby and her daughter Liza (played by Marcy Walker).

Bassey also has appeared in a number of prime time television shows, include a recurring roles on Falcon Crest and Grey's Anatomy, and well as guest shots on In the Heat of the Night, Who's the Boss?, Murphy Brown, Matlock, L.A. Law, and Law & Order. Her film credits include Waxwork (1988), The Bonfire of the Vanities (1990), Dunston Checks In (1996), and 27 Dresses (2007).

In 2017, Bassey returned to daytime television in both its traditional and new media incarnations, joining the casts of ABC soap opera General Hospital playing Quinn Danvers, and Daytime Emmy-winning digital soap opera Anacostia as Beverly Newman. For her performance as Beverly on Anacostia, Bassey received her second Daytime Emmy nomination in the "Outstanding Guest Performer in a Digital Drama" category in 2018.

Personal life
Bassey has been married twice, she married attorney Roy F. Emery in 1971 until his death in 1991. In 2004, she married her longtime companion, playwright Luther Davis until his death in 2008 at the age of 91. In November 2016 she became engaged to George Bamford in Waikiki, Hawaii.

In June 2015, Bassey made headlines when she was forced off a commercial airliner after a dispute with a flight attendant.

Bassey resides in Manhattan and West Palm Beach, Florida.

Filmography

Film

Television

References

External links
 Jennifer Bassey Official Website
 
 
 Jennifer Bassey's Profile at  soapcentral.com

1942 births
20th-century American actresses
21st-century American actresses
American soap opera actresses
Alumni of RADA
Actresses from Chicago
Living people